The women's 5000 metres event at the 2001 Summer Universiade was held in Beijing, China on 1 September.

Results

References

Athletics at the 2001 Summer Universiade
2001 in women's athletics
2001